Discheramocephalus is a genus of feather-winged beetles, the smallest beetles on earth, first found in Cameroon. It was originally described in 2007 as a monotypic genus (only a single known species). Six additional species were added in 2008, and two were added in 2013.

Species 
Discheramocephalus bisulcatus Darby, 2013
Discheramocephalus brucei Grebennikov, 2008
 Discheramocephalus elisabethae Grebennikov, 2008
 Discheramocephalus jarmilae Grebennikov, 2008
 Discheramocephalus mikaeli Grebennikov, 2008
 Discheramocephalus minutissimus Grebennikov, 2008
 Discheramocephalus semisulcatus Johnson, 2007
 Discheramocephalus stewarti Grebennikov, 2008
Discheramocephalus vasilii Darby, 2013

References

Further reading 
 Grebennikov, Vasily V. "Discheramocephalini, a new pantropical tribe of featherwing beetles (Coleoptera: Ptiliidae): description of new taxa and phylogenetic analysis." Systematic Entomology 34.1 (2009): 113–136.

Ptiliidae
Beetles described in 2007